Manuel Tecson Yan, Sr. (January 24, 1920 – December 4, 2008) was a Cabinet Secretary of the Aquino, Ramos and Estrada administrations, World War II veteran and Chief of Staff of the Armed Forces of the Philippines from 1968 until 1972. He holds the singular Philippine Government Record of continuous longest serving public Officer from April 1937 to January 2001 or a total 63 years and 9 months spanning twelve Philippine Presidents.

Military life

PMA Cadet
Yan entered the Philippine Military Academy (PMA) after graduating in the Arellano High School in 1937 and became a part of the PMA Class of 1941.

On graduation day, Manuel T. Yan received the Presidential Sabre. This is a symbol of superiority in both academic work and military training, from Vice President Sergio Osmeña, the commencement speaker. In finishing at the top of his class, Manuel T. Yan became one of the few to accomplish this feat as a high school graduate. Many young boys who join the PMA do so after one, two or even three years of college work.

Military service
He joined the Armed Forces of the Philippines in 1941. In 1942, he survived the Pantingan River Massacre, which took place during the Bataan Death March.

Chief of Staff of the Armed Forces of the Philippines
After serving as the Chief of the Philippine Constabulary, Yan was appointed by President Ferdinand Marcos as the Chief of Staff of the Armed Forces of the Philippines. In the AFP's history, Yan (at the age of 48) was the youngest military member who had ever held this position. However, Yan resigned his post in 1972 because he did not want to be involved with the implementation of martial law. It is said that Yan's resignation was intended by Marcos to make the implementation of the proclamation of Martial Law possible. In 1971, Yan had prominently told media that the grounds for Marcos to either impose martial law or suspend the privilege of the writ of habeas corpus did not exist.

Post military service

Yan served the foreign service from 1972 to 1992 in various capacities as first Ambassador to Thailand up to 1981, then Ambassador to Indonesia up to 1987. After the resignation of Secretary of Foreign Affairs Salvador Laurel, he was nominated as Secretary of Foreign Affairs from February to October 1987, after which he served as Undersecretary of Foreign Affairs up to 1990 and finally as Ambassador to the United Kingdom up to 1992.

From 1992 – 1994, he was appointed GRP chairman negotiating with Moro rebels.

In 1994, President Fidel V. Ramos appointed him as the Presidential Adviser on Peace Process, a position which he retained until the overthrow from the presidency of Ramos' successor, Joseph Estrada.

Among his notable achievements as the Presidential Adviser on Peace Process was engineering a peace pact with the Moro National Liberation Front, which signed the agreement with government in 1996 known as the 1996 Final Peace Agreement.

Yan was awarded (in February 2008) an honorary degree by De La Salle University, a degree of Doctor of Humanities honoris causa for being the longest serving government official, serving eleven presidents from Manuel Quezon to Joseph Estrada. He served 63 continuous years from 1937 to 2001, a record which has not been broken as of 2019.

Personal life
Yan was firstly married to Amelia Acab (deceased) and later remarried Eloisa Fernandez. His children are Manuel Jr., Bev, Roby, Sita, Egay, Mawie, Leo, Mina, Joy, Raul and Lou. He is the grandfather of Justice Undersecretary Emmeline Aglipay-Villar, Congressman Michael Edgar Yan Aglipay, actor and matinee idol Rico Yan (1975–2002), and TV host and former San Juan councilor Bobby Yan.

Death and legacy
Yan died on December 4, 2008, in a hospital in Pasig. Camp General Manuel T. Yan Sr. in Mawab, Compostela Valley is named after him.

See also
Chairman of the Joint Chiefs (Philippines)

References

Chairmen of the Joint Chiefs (Philippines)
Filipino generals
Filipino people of Chinese descent
Presidential Advisers on the Peace Process of the Philippines
Filipino military personnel of World War II
1920 births
2008 deaths
Secretaries of Foreign Affairs of the Philippines
Ambassadors of the Philippines to the United Kingdom
Corazon Aquino administration cabinet members
Ramos administration cabinet members
Burials at the Manila Memorial Park – Sucat
Estrada administration cabinet members
Philippine Military Academy alumni
Ferdinand Marcos administration personnel
Bataan Death March prisoners